Westdowns (sometimes spelt incorrectly as Westdown) is a small hamlet in north Cornwall, England, United Kingdom. It lies half-a-mile south-west of Delabole and is sometimes considered part of that village, however, Westdowns is a distinct settlement. It is on the B3314 road.

References

External links

Hamlets in Cornwall